Cheqa (also Romanized as Cheqā and Choqā) is a village in Masumiyeh Rural District, in the Central District of Arak County, Markazi Province, Iran. At the 2006 census, its population was 55, in 13 families.

References 

Populated places in Arak County